Eleuterio Rodolfi (1876–1933) was an Italian actor, screenwriter and film director. He was a leading figure in Italian cinema during the silent era, directing over a hundred films including The Last Days of Pompeii (1913).

Selected filmography

Director
 The Last Days of Pompeii (1913)
Doctor Antonio (1914)
 Hamlet (1917)
 Maciste's American Nephew (1924)

Producer
 The Painting of Osvaldo Mars (1921)

References

Bibliography 
 Everett, Wendy. Questions of Colour in Cinema: From Paintbrush to Pixel. Peter Lang, 2007.

External links 
 

1876 births
1933 deaths
20th-century Italian screenwriters
Italian male screenwriters
Italian film directors
Film people from Bologna
20th-century Italian male writers